The Tun Abdul Razak Complex, (Malay: Kompleks Tun Abdul Razak; Chinese: 光大大厦; Tamil:  கொம்டார் கோபுரம்); colloquially known by its Malay acronym Komtar, formerly known as the Penang New Urban Center and the Central Area Redevelopment Plan for Penang, is a multicomplex located in the city of George Town, Penang, Malaysia. The complex comprises retail outlets, a transportation hub, and a skyscraper, containing the administrative offices of the Penang state government. It was named after Abdul Razak Hussein, the second Prime Minister of Malaysia, who officiated the construction of the complex. It was the tallest building in George Town, Penang and Malaysia upon completion. Until 1988, it became the second-tallest building, after the completion of the Maybank Tower.

The first phase of the construction of the complex started in 1974, and was completed in 1988. At the time of its completion, the skyscraper was the third-tallest building outside the Western Hemisphere (after Sunshine 60 in Tokyo and One Raffles Place in Singapore). The building maintained its status as the country's tallest skyscraper for another two years before being surpassed by the  Menara Maybank in Kuala Lumpur in 1988.

Further efforts to revitalise Komtar include the launch of The Gravityz, billed as the world's highest rope course, at the exterior of the skyscraper's 65th floor in 2018.

Komtar is known for being one of the most notable uses of modernist and brutalist architecture in Asia. Komtar's legacy remains controversial: some noted it as an icon for Penang's post-industrialization prosperity after the 1970s; others represent the building with urban decay and the intentional destruction of local traditional heritage.

History

Background 
The  site from which Komtar now occupies was originally a stretch of the Prangin River, which ran through a swamp. Upon the outbreak of the Napoleonic Wars, the construction of a defensive stone canal began under probable directions from the British East India Company in 1804. Its base was constructed with bakau pillars and shorewood, a common construction technique of the time in Penang, and was filled with granite blocks. The canal was meant for agricultural and commercial uses, and it marks the furthest boundaries of George Town.

The region, populated since the mid-19th century, became a dense metropolitan area after the arrival of Chinese immigrants from the Hui'an region of Fujian, China. There were five major roads that occupied the site: Magazine Road, which runs within the city centre until the Magazine Circus; Penang Road, which runs from Farquhar Street to Brick Kiln Road (now Gurdwara Road); Prangin Road (now Dr. Lim Chwee Leong Road), which ran along the Prangin Canal;  Maxwell Road, the northernmost road of the Seven Sisters Precinct; and Gladstone Road, which ran from the Magazine Circus, to the junction between Penang Road, Mcnair Street, and Carnarvon Street. In the 1880s, the Sia Boey Market was constructed, made of cast iron. A drinking fountain was also set up at the place.

The region was also noted for the Magazine Circus (Magazine Junction), a roundabout converging on a junction of six roads, where the Gladstone Road, Macalister Road, Brick Kiln Road, Dato Keramat Road, Magazine Road and Penang Road coincide. The Malays called it Simpang Enam, carrying the literal meaning of 'the six-way junction'; the Chinese called it the Go Pha Teng, which means 'the five lamps', referring to the Municipal lamps set up at the middle of the junction. The junction was where the first traffic lights in Penang were set up in 1928.

The area suffered great destruction during the Second World War. Between 10 and 13 December 1941, the city was bombed by Japanese bombers. The regions around Penang Road, which were filled with upturned rickshaws, were mistaken by the bombers as anti-aircraft guns; and thus were bombed heavily with serious casualties. A bomb in particular, scored a direct hit on the Sia Boey Market, which was by then the most populated market in Penang.

Planning 
The decline of George Town as a major entrepot in the late 1950s, exacerbated in the following decade when Penang's free port status was revoked, created recessions. Proposals to rejuvenate the city-centre were first devised in 1962. In 1969, then newly appointed Chief Minister of Penang, Lim Chong Eu approved the formation of the Central Area Redevelopment Plan. The urban plan called for preservations of heritage and modern developments in the city. Design was carried out by Architects Team 3 (AT3), led by Lim Chong Keat, Lim Chong Eu's brother. The construction was to mark the arrival of a shift in Penang's stagnancy, the start of a period of industrialisation, embracing modern approaches to its architecture. It was meant to revitalise the city of George Town by creating a complex that would house administrative, commercial, retail and transportation functions under one roof, as well as projecting Penang's relative new modernist architectural scene in the post-independence era. The urban renewal effort was first proposed in 1962. A report from Robert Nathan recognised that George Town was beginning to show signs of decline, with the majority of the city's residences consisting of 19th-century shophouses that were in derelict conditions and had turned into slums.

By the time Lim Chong Eu took over as the Chief Minister of Penang in 1969, the state of decline in Penang had been exacerbated by the revocation of Penang's free entrepôt status. Thus, the Komtar project was seen as an attempt to reverse the declining fortunes of George Town and revitalise both the city and the state of Penang as a whole.

Design 

A masterplan for George Town drawn up in the 1960s called for the conservation of the historic city centre as a heritage site, whilst an 11-hectare area bounded by four roads—Prangin, Maxwell, Penang and Magazine Roads—was to be developed into the 'Penang New Urban Centre' consisting of a four-storey podium, three 17-storey residential blocks and a central 65-storey skyscraper. The proposed complex also included a geodesic dome inspired by the designs of Buckminster Fuller, a colleague of Lim Chong Keat.

The central skyscraper was to house administrative offices of the Penang state government, while the geodesic dome would contain a multipurpose hall. As noted by Dr Gwynn Jenkins in her book, Contested Space, the three residential blocks were to provide a socially-engineered residential community in flats of mixed-income and ethnicity. In addition, the complex was also planned to serve as a commercial district and a public transportation hub, all of which were to be condensed under one roof.

The skyscraper shape is from a 12-sided cylindrical shape.

The complex was designed by Architects Team 3 (AT3) of Singapore, led by Lim Chong Keat. Lim recounted that he was responsible in making sure that the appointed consultants were competent, and of sufficient national and worldwide standing required to accomplish the project. Experts of other fields, including social researchers from Universiti Sains Malaysia (USM) and a traffic consultant were also included.

Construction 

The Komtar project only got off the ground in 1970, during the tenure of Lim Chong Eu as the then Chief Minister of Penang. It was the single most ambitious urban renewal project undertaken by Penang Development Corporation, the development arm of the Penang state government. The master plan was divided into five phases of implementation.

However, the Komtar project also entailed the destruction of hundreds of colonial-era shophouses, schools and temples around the 11-hectare site, displacing the more established neighborhoods in the process. Notably, Gladstone Road, which once ran through the area, was wiped off the map when the construction of Komtar commenced.

The then-Prime Minister of Malaysia, Tun Abdul Razak Hussein, officiated the first piling ceremony on 1 January 1974, during which he clarified that the project would change the city's appearance and discard the colonial heritage image in favour of one which reflected the identity of Malaysia and its multi-ethnic culture.

Komtar Tower was topped out in 1985, making it the tallest skyscraper in Malaysia at the time. The 65-storey, 232-metre-tall skyscraper was also the second-tallest in Asia at that point, behind Sunshine 60 in Tokyo, Japan. Komtar Tower was officially completed the following year and remained as the tallest skyscraper in Malaysia until 1988.

Decline 
As part of Phase 1, Komtar Tower had been completed in 1986. However, out of the original five phases, only Phases 1 and 2A, the latter which involved the creation of Komtar Walk, a 155-metre-long walkway lined with food outlets, was never completed according to plan. Phases 3 and 4 were jointly developed with private firms into Prangin Mall and 1st Avenue Mall, respectively.

While Komtar was originally built to revitalise George Town, by the early 2000s, it became a white elephant itself. The displacement of entire neighbourhoods and businesses during the construction of Komtar in the 1970s and 1980s caused the vicinity of Komtar to become depopulated, thus depriving the retailers within Komtar of a catchment area. The 1997 Asian financial crisis exacerbated the decline of Komtar, while the completion of newer shopping malls throughout George Town led to retailers in Komtar shutting down in droves. Potential tenants and the general public alike were also unimpressed by Komtar's poor maintenance, its confusing interior layout and dark, garbage-strewn corners.

It was estimated that, as of 2008, some 40% of the retailers in Komtar had left the skyscraper, while many others simply left their shop lots closed.

Revitalisation 
As part of the Penang state government's initiative to regain the glory days of Komtar, a revitalisation effort was launched in late 2012. Only World Group (OWG) was awarded the RM50 million renovation project, which included the construction of a banquet hall at level 5, a 30,000-square-foot boulevard to house food and beverage (F&B) outlets, an international-themed restaurant at levels 59 and 60, a sky restaurant at level 64 and a sky lounge at level 65.

in 2015, three new floors were added onto the Komtar Tower, thus increasing its height to 249 metres. The top floor (68th floor) was topped with a rooftop Sky Bar, as well as the highest glass skywalk in Malaysia. Dubbed the Rainbow Skywalk, the 16-metre semi-circular glass skywalk is also the first of its kind in Southeast Asia. The U-shaped glass walkway is constructed from the same glass material as that of Grand Canyon Skywalk and is designed to withstand a total weight of 16 adults.

Three high-speed bubble lifts were also installed, two of which connect a theme park at level 5 to levels 65, 66 and 67, while the other links level 59 with the level 68 summit. While the bubble lifts were initially designed with a transparent glass wall to allow for a panoramic view of George Town on the way up, the lifts were modified in 2016 following safety advice by the Department of Occupational Safety and Health for the bubble lifts to be completely concealed.

In 2018, The Gravityz, a  rope course outside the 65th floor, was opened to the public. Specialised gear imported from Switzerland are utilised, and for safety purposes, only six people, weighing not more than  total, are allowed along the platform at any given time.

Features

Floor Directory 

The floor directory has been updated as of August 2017 to include the latest tourist attractions, collectively known as The Top.

The Top 

The renovation works conducted by OWG are intended to turn Komtar Tower into a modern tourist attraction in the heart of George Town. Collectively, the renovation project was officially named The Top.

The attractions are as follows.

Rainbow Skywalk (Level 68) – Horseshoe-shaped cantilever bridge with a glass walkway.
The Gravityz (Level 65) – a  rope course along the exterior of the 65th floor, including a zip-line challenge
Coco Cabana Bar & Bistro (Level 68) – Fine dining section.
Tower Club Penang (Levels 59, 60, 66 & 67) – Lounge, clubhouse and gym.
Observatory Deck (Level 65) 
Top View Restaurant and Lounge (formerly known as 59Sixty) (Levels 59 & 60) 
 The Grand Ballroom (Level 5).
Theme parks (Levels 3, 4, 5 & 6).
Penang State Gallery 
Playote – live feed-enabled customised augmented reality game.
5D Sea Explorer 
7D Planetarium Dome 
Jurassic Research Centre 
The Top Picks

Dewan Tunku Geodesic Dome (Tech Dome Penang) 

The Dewan Tunku Geodesic Dome, located on level 5, is a partial-spherical structure based on a pattern of circles called geodesics which intersects to form triangular elements. These triangular elements spread the stress across the entire structure. It is based on a concept studied, developed and popularised by R. Buckminster Fuller.

The main entrance to the Geodesic Dome is from the auditorium level and is also accessible from level 4.

The multi-purpose hall Dome was used for performances, official functions, concerts and other events.

As part of the recent renovation works, the Dome and the squash centre have been transformed into Tech Dome Penang. The dome now contains the following galleries:

Optics – demonstrates the unique characteristics of different types of light.
Information technology – celebrates the humble sand and its place in modern technology.
Life tech – takes a walk through the sciences and technologies that maintain human health.
Robotics – an apartment coming to life with robotics showing contemporary as well as future applications of robotics including for entertainment, medicine, rescue, military, industry, education and household.
Exploration zone – a space dedicated to young children with games and activities that challenge them to think, explore and play while indirectly learning scientific concepts.
Penang transformation – tells the story of Penang's evolution from the 1960s to the high-technology industries of today.

ICT Digital Mall 

ICT Digital Mall @ Komtar, or simply ICT Mall, is a new retail development managed by Venice Gateway Sdn. Bhd. Opened in November 2010, it occupies the space originally occupied by Yaohan Department Store and later by Aktif Lifestyle Store. The new mall is geared towards offering shoppers an array of electrical and electronic products including computer hardware and software, telecommunication products such as cellular phones, cameras and other photography gear.

A food court is also located at the ground floor of ICT Digital Mall @ Komtar, as well as the Asia Comic Cultural Museum at level 2. To ensure smooth traffic flow to ICT Mall, a new overhead pedestrian bridge is constructed to link the third floor of ICT Mall to 1st Avenue Mall.

Pacific Hypermarket & Departmental Store 
Pacific Komtar is the 74th outlet chain of The Store Corporation Berhad in Malaysia. Pacific Komtar is occupying the first 2 floors of the podium block.

Komtar Walk
Komtar Walk, which covers a  stretch parallel to Prangin Road, is a food and beverage hub developed by Pacific Hypermarket & Department Store Sdn Bhd.

Komtar Walk houses F&B outlets underneath an open-air lightweight roof. The 19 outlets, five of which are single-storey ones, stand in a single structure at the foot of the overhead bridge facing the outdoor car park. Seven more are connected to Komtar Tower next to the George Town White Coffee outlet while the remaining seven outlets, which are all double-storey, are located opposite. These two rows are separated by a 5m walkway, which also allows for outdoor seating.

Komtar Bus Terminal

The Komtar Bus Terminal serves as the hub of public bus services within George Town, which is currently provided by Rapid Penang. A large majority of Rapid Penang bus routes within Penang Island radiate from this terminal, thus making Komtar accessible from all parts of Penang Island.

Adjacent buildings

Hotel Jen

Hotel Jen is a 4-star hotel next to Komtar Tower. It was originally built as part of Phase 2A. Upon completion in the 1980s, it became the Shangri-La Penang and remained so until it was rebranded in the 2000s as Traders Hotel.

Prangin Mall

Prangin Mall was initially planned as part of Phase 3 of the Komtar project. Named after Prangin Road, also known as Jalan Dr Lim Chwee Leong, Prangin Mall was opened in 2001. It caters to a market ranging from lower to middle class. The mall comprises six levels including a basement floor, two levels of basement parking and a further three levels of parking at the upper floors. In recent years, Prangin Mall is also well known for a wide range of electronic retail outlets.

1st Avenue Mall 

Originally part of Phase 4, 1st Avenue Mall at Magazine Road was completed and opened in 2010. At present, the shopping mall features 655,000 square feet in gross floor area and spreads over 7 retail levels. The mall's top floor also contains a TGV Cineplex.

Future developments
As of January 2017, Phase 5 has never been completed. The area allocated for Phase 5 covers the abandoned historic Sia Boey Market, located just east of 1st Avenue Mall, and is bounded by four streets—McNair Road, Prangin Road (Jalan Dr. Lim Chwee Leong), Magazine Road and Carnavon Street.

Penang Heritage Square

In July 2012, Phase 5 was earmarked by the Penang state government and Penang Development Corporation to be developed into Penang's new heritage enclave, known as Heritage Square. This would be in line with George Town's World Heritage Listing as well as to complement PDC's revitalisation efforts for Komtar as the socio-civic centre and business hub of Penang. This prime 4.5 acres of land in the heart of George Town will predominantly be public space. The Heritage Square and Centre will dedicate, consecrate and restore the cultural vibrancy of George Town by promoting the living heritage and street life in the inner city, as well as greening the city, thus ensuring a balanced development for the area. The project, which is currently under construction, with an objective of revitalising the Komtar Phase 5 area, and to improve the heritage value and significance of the site by creating urban spaces and landscapes for healthy urban living. The development of Heritage Square Project will revitalise the adjacent Komtar building complex which is directed at regaining the glory of Komtar as the nerve centre of Penang.

The components of Penang's Heritage Square consist of the following:
Restoration and refurbishment of the existing "Sia Boey" (Prangin Market) structure

This will revitalise the "Sia Boey" into a retail and tourist site, comprising among other things a visitors' centre, crafts and souvenir retail areas, flowers and food hubs. To expand the "Sia Boey", market, it is expected that PDC will build an additional adjacent market to complement the existing one for a similar function. This restoration would mark the core zone boundary of the George Town UNESCO Heritage Site.

 Creation of urban spaces

As George Town needs more public space for recreation, public congregation, celebrations and cultural performances, the urban public space which include some green areas will be promoted as the first of its kind in Penang for healthy living. The heritage celebration square will also provide a spot for a centre of culture, arts and traditions in George Town, in turn promoting cultural vibrancy and the concept of melting pot of cultures in the inner city.

 Creation of a Heritage Celebration Square
To refurbish and reinstate the urban setting of the area whereby existing traditional pre-war shophouses along Maxwell Road will undergo adaptive reuse into cafes, coffee shops, tea houses, crafts and handicraft centres, mini-museums, boutiques and B&B hotels which are parallel with the heritage theme. To also reinstate urban setting and usage of the area whereby Maxwell Road will only be limited to pedestrians, and thus promoted as a walking street.

 George Town Heritage Centre (GHC)
This 5-storey building will serve as a venue for arts, cultural, heritage, community, youth and performing activities. The GHC will be raised above street level to provide street plazas for the public.

 Restoration of Prangin Canal
To restore the Prangin Canal with plans for hawkers street food zone and street furniture amidst well-landscaped areas.

In June 2016, however, "Sia Boey" (Phase 5) was identified as a likely site for a transportation hub for the planned Light Rail Transit (LRT) and Mass Rail Transit (MRT) interchange under the Penang Transport Master Plan. The planned Penang Arts District has now been shifted to an alternative 9.2-acre vacant site off Macallum Street Ghaut and Tun Dr Lim Chong Eu Expressway, located 500 metres east of the Sia Boey Market.

See also 
List of tallest buildings in George Town
 Komtar Skywalk

References

Office buildings in Penang
Skyscraper office buildings in Malaysia
Buildings and structures in George Town, Penang
Government buildings in Malaysia
KOMTAR
Round buildings
1986 establishments in Malaysia
Office buildings completed in 1986
Modernist architecture in Malaysia
Tourist attractions in George Town, Penang